The Care of Your Car is a British television programme which aired on the BBC during 1947. As the title suggests, the series was about looking after a car. The episodes aired irregularly in a 20-minute time-slot. The series is believed to be lost.

Episode list
"The Chassis" (26 January 1947)
"Steering, Brakes and Tyres" (30 March 1947)
"The Engine" (27 April 1947)
"More About the Engine" (1 June 1947)
"Electrical Equipment" (4 July 1947)

References

External links
The Care of Your Car on IMDb

1940s British television series
1947 British television series debuts
1947 British television series endings
BBC Television shows
Black-and-white British television shows
Automotive television series
Lost BBC episodes